Gaziantepspor enjoy most of their support from the city and surrounding provinces. Their main ultra group is called Gençlik-27, (Youngers 27), 27 corresponds to the cities code. Gençlik 27 was founded in 1996 by Hasan Günoğlu also known as Hasan Reis (Reis meaning Boss).  The supporter groups are renowned for creating a great atmosphere at home games with their red flare flags and are found in the 5th and 6th stands behind the goal. They are known all around the world for acts of hooliganism and violence like every Turkish fan and club.

References

Gaziantepspor
Association football culture
Turkish football supporters' associations
1990s establishments in Turkey